Café Puro is a coffee brand in the Philippines owned by Commonwealth Foods, Inc. The brand was introduced in 1952, along with the company's several (now defunct) coffee brands—Café Bueno, Café Excellente and Lé Café—in ground and instant varieties.

Sponsorships
Café Puro has sponsored many of Manny Pacquiao's boxing fights and was, along with Nike and Air Asia, one of the main sponsors of his fight with Floyd Mayweather Jr.

References

Food brands of the Philippines
Coffee brands
Philippine companies established in 1952
Food and drink companies established in 1952
Coffee in the Philippines